Susan Harris (née Spivak; born October 28, 1940) is an American television writer and producer, creator of Emmy Award-winning sitcoms Soap (1977–1981) and The Golden Girls (1985–1992). Between 1975 and 1998, Harris was one of the most prolific television writers, creating 13 comedy series. In 2011, she was inducted into the Television Hall of Fame.

Life and career
The first script Harris sold was Then Came Bronson. She then wrote for Love, American Style, All in the Family, The Partridge Family and the TV adaptation of Neil Simon's Barefoot in the Park. Her abortion episode for the Bea Arthur-starring series Maude in the 1970s won Harris the Humanitas Prize. She worked with Arthur again in the 1980s when Arthur took one of the lead roles in The Golden Girls.

Harris created many television series: Fay, Soap, Loves Me, Loves Me Not, Benson, It Takes Two, The Golden Girls, Empty Nest, Nurses, Good & Evil, The Golden Palace and The Secret Lives of Men. Her most financially successful show was The Golden Girls.

Harris was diagnosed with chronic fatigue syndrome, and her symptoms affected her ability to participate in the production of The Golden Girls. In an episode of that show titled "Sick and Tired" (1989), Harris wrote some of her struggles into the storyline where Bea Arthur's character Dorothy Zbornak was diagnosed with chronic fatigue syndrome. It later turned out Harris had an adrenal issue, but she wrote the episode as "my revenge script for all the people out there who had a disease like that".

Harris formed the production company Witt/Thomas/Harris Productions with Paul Junger Witt and Tony Thomas.

Harris married television producer Paul Junger Witt on September 18, 1983; he co-produced all the shows she created. He died in 2018. She was married from 1965 to 1969 to actor Berkeley Harris; the couple's son is author Sam Harris. She lives in suburban Los Angeles. Harris was the step-sister to American film producer, editor and screenwriter Marion Segal Freed.

Awards and honors
She was honored with the Writers' Guild's Paddy Chayefsky Award in 2005 and inducted into the Television Academy Hall of Fame in 2011.

Credits

References

External links 
 
 Museum of Broadcast Communications profile of Susan Harris

1940 births
Living people
American comedy writers
American television writers
American women in business
Jewish American writers
Businesspeople from New York (state)
Writers from Mount Vernon, New York
People with chronic fatigue syndrome
Television producers from New York (state)
American women television writers
Screenwriters from New York (state)
American women television producers
21st-century American Jews
21st-century American women